The 1908 New Zealand general election was held on Tuesday, 17 and 24 November and 1 December in the general electorates, and on Wednesday, 2 December in the Māori electorates to elect a total of 80 MPs to the 17th session of the New Zealand Parliament. A total number of 537,003 (79.8%) voters turned out to vote.

Changes to the electoral law
The Second Ballot Act 1908 provided for second or runoff ballots between the top two candidates where the top candidate did not get an absolute majority. The second ballot was held 7 days after the first ballot except in 10 large rural seats, where 14 days were allowed. In 1908, 22 second ballots were held on 24 November and 1 (Bay of Plenty) on 1 December. At the 1911 election, all 30 second ballots were held 7 days later. Two 1909 by-elections (in Rangitikei and Thames) also required second ballots.

The Second Ballot Act of 1908, which did not apply to the Maori electorates, was repealed in 1913.

Summary of results

Party totals
The following table gives party strengths and vote distribution.

Votes summary

Electorate results
The following are the results of the 1908 general election:

Key

|-
 |colspan=8 style="background-color:#FFDEAD" | General electorates
|-

|-
 |colspan=8 style="background-color:#FFDEAD" | Māori electorates
|-

|}
Table footnotes:

Summary of changes
 A boundary redistribution resulted in the abolition of seven seats:
 Caversham, held by Thomas Sidey
 Courtenay, held by Charles Lewis
 Hawera, held by Charles E. Major
 Mount Ida, held by John MacPherson
 Newtown, held by William Barber
 Waiapu, held by James Carroll
 Waikouaiti, held by Thomas Mackenzie
 At the same time, seven new seats came into being:
 Dunedin West
 Gisborne
 Stratford
 Taumarunui
 Tauranga
 Wellington South
 Wellington Suburbs

Notes

References